Lucien Cossou (born 29 January 1936 in Marseille) is a former professional  French footballer.

External links
Profile
Profile
Career detail 

1936 births
Living people
French footballers
France international footballers
Ligue 1 players
Olympique Lyonnais players
AS Monaco FC players
SC Toulon players
Footballers from Marseille
French sportspeople of Beninese descent
Association football forwards
Pays d'Aix FC players
ES La Ciotat players
Black French sportspeople